Lunar lava tubes are lava tubes on the Moon formed during the eruption of basaltic lava flows. When the surface of a lava flow cools, it hardens and the lava can channel beneath the surface in a tube-shaped passage. Once the flow of lava diminishes, the tube may drain, forming a hollow void. Lunar lava tubes are formed on sloped surfaces that range in angle from 0.4° to 6.5°. These tubes may be as wide as  before they become unstable against gravitational collapse. However, stable tubes may still be disrupted by seismic events or meteoroid bombardment.

The existence of a lava tube is sometimes revealed by the presence of a "skylight", a place in which the roof of the tube has collapsed, leaving a circular hole that can be observed by lunar orbiters.

Observational evidence

An area displaying a lava tube and rilles is the Marius Hills region. In 2008, an opening to a lava tube in this area may have been discovered by the Japanese Kaguya spacecraft. The skylight was photographed in more detail in 2011 by NASA's Lunar Reconnaissance Orbiter, showing both the 65-meter-wide pit and the floor of the pit about 36 meters below. Additionally, the Hadley Rille may have been a partly roofed lava channel, some parts of which have since collapsed. There may also be lava tubes in the Mare Serenitatis.

The ISRO Chandrayaan-1 orbiter imaged a lunar rille formed by an ancient lunar lava flow with an uncollapsed segment indicating the likely presence of a lava tube near the lunar equator.

Gravitometric observations by the GRAIL spacecraft suggest the presence of lunar lava tubes with widths of over 1 km.

Proposed exploration
Several groups have proposed robotic missions to explore lunar and Martian lava tubes.

The "Moon Diver" mission led by Laura Kerber proposes to send the two-wheeled AXEL extreme-terrain rover developed at NASA-JPL into a lunar pit in order to investigate the history of the lunar mare and flood basalt eruptions.

In 2019, the European Space Agency launched a campaign through the ESA's Open Space Innovation Platform (OSIP) to evaluate innovative proposals aimed at the exploration, documentation and 3D mapping of volcanic cavities on the Moon. Two complementary studies have been selected, the Descent And Exploration in Deep Autonomy of Lava Underground Structures (DAEDALUS) Sphere and the RoboCrane. DAEDALUS is a prototype designed by the University of Wurzburg (Germany), the Jacobs University (Germany), the University of Padua (Italy), the INAF-Osservatorio di Padova (Italy) and the VIGEA-Virtual Geographic Agency (Italy).
This prototype is equipped with several components capable of performing a high-definition 3D mapping during the descent and moving autonomously within a lava tube. This system is in fact equipped with LIDAR and stereoscopic cameras to guarantee almost total coverage in order to acquire data in any condition.

Sites for human habitats

Lunar lava tubes may potentially serve as enclosures for human habitats. These natural tunnels provide protection from cosmic radiation, solar radiation, meteorites, micrometeorites, and ejecta from impacts. They are insulated from the extreme temperature variations on the lunar surface and could provide a stable environment for inhabitants.

Lunar lava tubes are typically found along the boundaries between lunar mares and highland regions. This would give ready access to: elevated regions, for communications; basaltic plains, for landing sites and regolith harvesting; and underground mineral resources.

See also
Volcanism on the Moon
Martian lava tube
Rille

References

Geological features on the Moon
Lava tubes
Lava tube